Madhavi is an important character in the Silapathikaram, one of the epics in Tamil literature. Silapathikaram is the first Kappiyam (epic) among the five in Tamil literature. It belongs to the Sangam Period. Madhavi was born in a lineage of courtesans, and was an accomplished dancer.
Madhavi is one of the three main characters in Silappatikaram, along with Kannagi and Kovalan.

Plot
Madhavi was the daughter of a dancer, Chitrapahti; they were believed to have a long ancestry, starting with the apsara Urvashi. Madhavi was rigorously trained in music, dance and composition of poems. Kovalan, the son of a wealthy merchant and the husband of Kannagi, met Madhavi in a performance in Chozha king Karikalan's court. Enamoured of her beauty, he fell in love with her. Eventually, Kovalan left his wife and moved in with Madhavi, with whom he stayed for a year. Madhavi bore him a daughter Manimekalai. However, after spending all his money on Madhavi, he realised his mistakes and returned to his wife Kannagi.

Love with Kovalan
Kovalan, who was married to Kannagi, fell in love with Madhavi when he saw her at her dancing debut in the court of the Chola king Karikalan. Kovalan left Kannagi and starts living with Madhavi. She lived with Kovalan happily for some time. During that period, Madhavi's mother stole all of Kannagi's wealth by using Kovalan's ring Kannaiyali without Madhavi and Kovalan's knowledge. After three years, Kovalan learned the truth about the mother's crime through the song kaveri kanal vary, during the festival of the god Indra. He grew angry with Madhavi and again returned to Kannagi. After Kovalan left her, Madhavi learned of her mother's theft and showed her moral worth by returning all the wealth of Kovalan to his father and renouncing the world to become a Buddhist nun.

Manimekalai, the daughter of Madhavi and Kovalan, who is the main character of another epic called "Manimegalai", written by Seethalai Sattanar, born to them in this period of love in between them at Kaveripoompatinam.

Kovalan's death
Kovalan and his wife left for Madurai to restore their fortunes by trade. In an unfortunate twist of events, he was mistakenly arrested for having stolen the queen's anklet and beheaded as the queen had a similar anklet. Upon hearing this, Kannagi set out to the court of the Pandya king Neduncheziyan and proved her husband's innocence. On realizing his mistake, the king died instantly. Kannagi took revenge by burning the whole city of Madurai with her curse, which she later took back due to the city goddess' request.

Upon learning the tragic turn of events, Madhavi shaved her hair and became a Buddhist nun.

References

Characters in Silappatikaram
Fictional Buddhist nuns